Spaniacris deserticola is a species of grasshopper in the family Romaleidae known as the Coachella Valley grasshopper and spanistic desert grasshopper. It is known from a few locations in the deserts of southern California and just across the border in Sonora, Mexico.

References

Romaleidae
Fauna of the Coachella Valley
Fauna of the Colorado Desert
Fauna of Riverside County, California
Fauna of the Sonoran Desert
Insects of Mexico
Insects of the United States
Insects described in 1937
Taxonomy articles created by Polbot